Synthesis is the fourth studio album by American rock band Evanescence. It was released on November 10, 2017, through BMG Rights Management. The album includes reworked orchestral and electronica arrangements of some of the band's previous material, in addition to two new songs, "Imperfection" and "Hi-Lo". The orchestra was arranged and conducted by David Campbell, with the album's production handled by Will Hunt (Spaceway) and Amy Lee.

Synthesis received generally positive reviews, which considered it an ambitious project and a natural progression of the band's sound. The album debuted at number eight on the US Billboard 200 and peaked at number one on the Classical Albums, Independent Albums, and Alternative Albums charts. It also charted internationally in 20 countries. Evanescence embarked on the Synthesis Live concert tour across North America, Europe, and Oceania from October 2017 to September 2018, accompanied on stage by a different orchestra in every city.

Background
After the end of the world tour for their 2011 self-titled third studio album, Evanescence took a hiatus from November 2012 to April 2015, during which the members pursued their own projects, while Lee and Evanescence also parted ways with long-term record label Wind-up Records, becoming independent artists. In an October 2015 interview, Lee stated that she was focusing on solo projects so there were no current plans for new Evanescence music yet, but the band would continue to tour through 2016. "It feels really good to have a lot of different things going on at once in the sense that I feel like I'm not just flexing one muscle", she said. The band made their return to the stage in November 2015, playing three US shows and performing at Ozzfest in Tokyo, Japan.

In February 2016, Lee said the band was working on the six-LP vinyl box set The Ultimate Collection, which includes all three studio albums, the previously unreleased 2000 demo CD Origin, the rarities compilation album Lost Whispers, new recordings, and other rarities and items. The box set was released in February 2017. In August 2016, Evanescence announced a fall tour with more concert dates in the US, during which they played the previously unheard song "Take Cover".

In October 2016, Lee confirmed in an interview that "there is Evanescence in the future", adding that she wants to take things step-by-step. She said in another interview that the band was not making a new album yet but working on a project that was "not exactly the most traditional thing", something that would take fans on a "different path that we wanna try". In February 2017, it was confirmed that the band was working in the studio, and Lee said the following month that the new project would be released later that year.

Conception
Synthesis was announced by Lee in a video posted on Evanescence's Facebook page on May 10, 2017. She stated that the album's title emerged from it being "the synthesis, the combination, the contrast, the synergy between the organic and the synthetic and also the past and present". The album is about "orchestra and electronica". Lee and the band went through their music catalog and selected songs "that are made to be heard in this way". The traditional rock instruments were replaced with "full orchestration and a completely synthetic world of beats and sounds" for this album. Lee said that it is not a remix, but songs re-worked "from the ground up", with "different tempos, different parts, intros and outros, segways and new pieces, and putting this all together like one big piece of music", likening it to a soundtrack. The album employs an entire orchestra with a variety of instruments. It contains two new original songs.

Lee felt inspired and challenged with Synthesis; part of the approach was "sometimes less is more", Lee adding that "at some point, you have to take something away to hear more of the raw power of a song, to expose its fragile but courageous heart." Lee acknowledged that the project is a risk, "because you're taking music that already worked, people already liked it and it's been there for a long time, and you're gonna go in and mess with it, change it, and show it to them in a different way that they might not like". Synthesis is a "total passion project", she said. "There are so many layers in our music underneath the huge drums and guitars. I've always wanted to shine a light on some of the gorgeous David Campbell arrangements and programming elements in our songs, and that idea snowballed into completely re-doing them with full orchestra, not just strings, elaborate programming and experimentation". She deemed it a fun experience that became "something bigger because you're really starting from scratch on the songs", and found the musical journey to be therapeutic. Lee said that she was excited about the new instrumental material on the album, as well as touring with an orchestra for the first time in Evanescence's career.

Composition and recording
For the project, Lee collaborated with Campbell, who arranged the strings for their previous three albums. Lee said that collaborating with Campbell on a more intricate level than before was essential to Synthesis. Will Hunt (Spaceway) and Lee produced the album, and Campbell arranged and conducted the orchestra. The orchestral sessions were recorded by Nashville Music Scoring Orchestra at Ocean Way Studios in Nashville, Tennessee.

"Imperfection", one of the original songs written for the album, is an electronic-symphonic track that features trip hop beats and a "swaggering cadence" and belting from Lee. The song is preceded in the album by a piano solo that serves as a segue; this piano piece introduces the song in its music video. Lee wrote the song from the perspective of a person who has lost someone to suicide and depression, and described it as a "plea to fight for your life". For Lee, the song was the most important on the album.

"Hi-Lo", the other original song on Synthesis, is a track originally written in 2007 by Lee with Hunt in their first collaboration ever. Lee wrote it about moving on, "but in a very non-confrontational, non-angry way. It's just, 'Hey, everything that happened, I'm over it and I'm not mad at you'." She said of its rebirth on Synthesis: "I've always had it at the top of my pile to release, but it never quite fit, it was never finished. The song is now finally home. I imagined it with strings and a full orchestra in that epic place". Hi-Lo contains "glacial industrial rhythms" and a violin solo from Lindsey Stirling.

The Synthesis version of "Bring Me to Life" replaces the drums and guitars from the original version with a strings arrangement, and excludes the rap. Its instrumentation includes crashing cymbals, "tension-building" timpani drums, and electronic elements alongside "soaring" strings. Several journalists described its new arrangement as "dramatic", "epic" and "cinematic". Lee described the song as "new" to her again as she incorporated vocals and musical elements she had "heard in [her] head" since its release.

For "End of the Dream", Lee wanted to re-record it in a way "that exposed the completely post-traumatic healing of a survivor- taking the time to focus on the pain, and then look up and past it, gathering the strength to live on, better [and] stronger." On the re-remake of "Your Star", Hunt used a vintage Roland SVC-350 vocoder for some beat processing, which "accidentally began picking up some distorted and very otherworldly sounding Mexican radio station's frequency at the end [of the song]". Lee said it added "a subtle level of authentic creepiness to the song", and mistakes like this are some of her favorite parts.

Release
On August 14, 2017, Evanescence announced that the album was in its final stages of recording. The reworked version of "Bring Me to Life" was made available for digital download and streaming on August 18, 2017. "Imperfection" was released as the lead single on September 15, 2017. That day, the album's pre-order and release date of November 10, 2017, was announced, and the band uploaded YouTube video clips titled Inside Synthesis of their process in the studio. The reworked version of "Lacrymosa" was made available to stream on October 27, 2017.

Synthesis, their fourth studio album, was released by BMG Rights Management. The deluxe edition of the album included a DVD documentary of the making of Synthesis, as well as instrumental and 5.1 surround mixes. On June 8, 2018, Evanescence released a performance-based video of "Hi-Lo", featuring violinist Lindsey Stirling.

Critical reception

Synthesis received generally positive reviews. At Metacritic, which applies a weighted average to reviews from mainstream critics, the album was given a score of 69 based on four reviews, indicating "generally favorable reviews". Renowned for Sounds Rachael Scarsbrook regarded it as Evanescence's "most ambitious project to date", writing, "there is a beating heart and spirit within this release that still hurts and evokes the most cathartic of responses". Suzy Exposito of Rolling Stone said that the remake of "Bring Me to Life" is an "act of artistic justice" for Lee and highlighted the album's two new "ambitious" songs. Kerri-Ann Roper of Belfast Telegraph felt Lee's vocal performance is "as powerful as ever" and Synthesis "is proof that old can be the, well, new new and still be just as satisfying." Chad Bowar of Loudwire considered the album "dynamic and compelling", and praised Lee's vocals, the mix of various instruments and the production, describing it as "grandiose and bombastic in parts, quiet and subdued in others".

Christa Titus of Billboard called Synthesis a "risk" and said the "elegant orchestrations" enhance "aspects of [Evanescence's] music that are often ignored". Siena Yates of The New Zealand Herald complimented Lee's voice and the "cinematic" classical foundation of Synthesis but found the album "weird" and "largely unnecessary", believing that stripping down and reworking the hits removed the "nostalgia" and "hooks" that made Evanescence stand out in their early days. Writing for Classic Rock, Stephen Dalton said that the "guitar-free remakes have a windswept grandeur and widescreen sonic palette lacking in the original recordings", and complimented the new songs, dubbing the album a "successful experiment". Blabbermouth.net deemed it Evanescence's "most ambitious effort to date", writing that "Lee's incredible vocal range and the group's expressive, multi-layered music naturally lends itself to orchestral accompaniment", creating a "truly dynamic, cinematic sound" while the passion "undoubtedly shines through". Beat Magazine hailed it a "riveting" album that takes the listener on a "sensory journey", with vocals that convey "piercing emotion". Varietys Roy Trakin wrote that "Lee firmly re-establishes herself as one of rock's pre-eminent vocalists", while the songs become "full-throttle, wide-screen epics" and the album evolves Evanescence's sound.

Catherine Morris of Metal Hammer considered Synthesis "an ambitious and unexpected move", stating that it impels Evanescence's music "into a new, alternate dimension", giving songs an "ethereal, cinematic makeover" and drawing the listener's attention to the "core melodies". Jim Fusilli of The Wall Street Journal felt that "the shift in style isn't without its risks" and "for the most part, the new approach works well" while the electronic percussion "gives the music yet another new trait". Reviewing for Kerrang!, Paul Travers expressed that the orchestral elements aren't a radical transformation as Evanescence's rock music "works with space and texture and [is] built around Lee's vocal and piano". Lee's vocals are "more confident" and the album "changes the format if not the feel" of songs, but the "electronic embellishments" felt distracting. AllMusic's Stephen Thomas Erlewine called Synthesis a "successful fusion" that "amounts to a step forward" for Evanescence, regarding it a "natural fit" for Lee, whose "powerhouse vocals often wrestle the orchestra into submission", and the "layered, skittering electronic rhythms" help give it "a steel spine". Alan Sculley of The Morning Call deemed it an "ambitious" project. In Music Week, George Graner characterized the album as inspired and a "bold artistic statement". Writing for Gig Wise, Catherine Verrechia said that introducing an orchestra feels like a "natural progression", and "surprisingly, the music still has many doses of heavy, atmospheric aspects". Evanescence "have progressed to another level musically" and Synthesis "is a prime example of showing growth".

Commercial performance
Synthesis debuted at number eight on the US Billboard 200 in the week ending on November 16, 2017, with 34,000 equivalent album units sold, 30,000 of which were traditional album sales. The album peaked at number one on the Classical Albums chart, the Independent Albums chart, and the Alternative Albums charts. It also debuted at the top of the Rock Albums chart.

Tour

In August 2017, Evanescence announced Synthesis Live, a concert tour during which they were accompanied on stage by a different 28-piece orchestra in every city. Synthesis Live received critical acclaim, with several publications calling it an ambitious tour. 

The tour kicked off in North America in October 2017, with 29 stops across the US and Canada, ending in December. It then traveled to Australia for four concerts performed in February 2018, followed by the European leg with 18 concerts in March and April 2018. The final leg of the tour was in North America with violinist Lindsey Stirling, for 31 concert dates from July to September 2018.

Track listing

Personnel
Credits adapted from the liner notes of Synthesis.

Evanescence
 Amy Lee – vocals, piano
 Troy McLawhorn – guitar
 Jen Majura – guitar, theremin
 Tim McCord – guitar, synths
 Will Hunt – drums

Additional musicians
 Will Hunt (Spaceway) – programming, synths
 Lindsey Stirling – violin on "Hi-Lo"
 David Campbell – orchestra arrangement, orchestra conducting

Technical

 Will Hunt (Spaceway) – production, engineering
 Amy Lee – production
 Damian Taylor – mixing
 Reese Murphy – additional engineering
 Robbie May – engineering assistance
 Nick Spezia – orchestral engineering
 Jasper LeMaster – orchestral engineering assistance
 Gary Hedden – additional audio editing
 Emily Lazar – mastering
 Chris Allgood – mastering assistance
 Ethan Mates – additional engineering on "Hi-Lo"

Artwork
 P. R. Brown – album art, design, photography
 Jeff Molyneaux – studio photography, videography
 Tyler Barksdale – studio photography, videography

Charts

Weekly charts

Year-end charts

Notes

References

2017 albums
Electronica albums by American artists
Evanescence albums
Orchestral music